Couch Potato was an Australian children's television show broadcast on ABC TV in Australia and a staple of Classic ABC.

Airing on Sunday mornings, it was a "wrapper" show linking three or four animated or live action shows aimed at older pre-teen and young teenage audiences.

Programmes
 The Adventures of Sam
 Alias the Jester
 Alvin and the Chipmunks
 The Angry Beavers
 The Animals of Farthing Wood
 Animated Classic Showcase
 Aquila
 Archibald the Koala
 The Baby-Sitters Club
 Bananaman
 Bangers and Mash
 The Biz
 Bump in the Night
 The Cat Came Back
 Clowning Around
 Cro
 Danger: Marmalade At Work
 Danger Mouse
 The Demon Headmaster
 Dog Tracer
 The Dreamstone
 EC Plays Lift Off
 Educating Marmalade
 Escape from Jupiter
 Finders Keepers
 The Genie From Down Under
 Ghostwriter
 Inspector Gadget
 Johnson and Friends
 Kideo
 Lift Off
 Minty
 Mot
 Odysseus: The Greatest Hero of Them All
 Orson and Olivia
 Plasmo
 The Real Story of...
 Return to Jupiter
 Rocko's Modern Life
 Roland Rat
 Roland Rat Goes East
 Roland Rat's Winter Wonderland
 Round the Bend
 Round the Twist
 Santo Bugito
 The Secret World of Alex Mack
 Simon and the Witch
 SimsalaGrimm
 Ship to Shore
 Stickin' Around
 Sun on the Stubble
 SuperTed
 Toucan Tecs
 The Trap Door
 True Tilda
 The Twisted Tales of Felix the Cat
 Watt on Earth
 The World of Peter Rabbit and Friends
 You Can't Do That on Television

Presenters
Grant Piro was the original host and stayed on the show for six years from 1991 to 1996.
During its run, Couch Potato's presenters included Grant Piro, David Erskine aka Gilbert Gusset, Joey Kennedy, Jess Keeley, Jane Nield, Sam Prest, David Heinrich and Abby Coleman.

History
 The show debuted on 17 March 1991 and ended on 24 June 2001.
 Originally intended to be an educational program for children, Grant Piro was asked to host by an Adelaide producer of the ABC. Ten episodes were initially filmed, based on science experiments in conjunction with the education department at the ABC.
 According to Grant Piro, "a producer and I decided to hijack the program. We said, 'how about we try and make it a bit more anarchic?’ We decided to break some of the ABC's rules and see how much we could get away with and we ended up breaking a lot of rules over the next six years. Couch Potato stopped being educational and became more about comic sketches and I think that's where the appeal took off”.
 In February 2005, Couch Potato had a spiritual successor in a similar show called Rollercoaster which aired on weekday afternoons and Sunday mornings until 30 January 2010.

See also
 ABC
 ABC Kids

References

External links
 Couch Potato (1991) on IMDB.com

Australian Broadcasting Corporation original programming
Australian children's television series
1991 Australian television series debuts
2001 Australian television series endings